Louis Alexander North (June 15, 1891 – May 15, 1974) was a professional baseball player.  He was a right-handed pitcher over parts of seven seasons (1913, 1917, 1920–1924) with the Detroit Tigers, St. Louis Cardinals and Boston Braves.  For his career, he compiled a 21–16 record in 172 appearances, most as a relief pitcher, with a 4.43 earned run average and 199 strikeouts.

In 1918 North served in the military during World War I.

See also
 List of Major League Baseball annual saves leaders

References

External links

1891 births
1974 deaths
Major League Baseball pitchers
Baseball players from Illinois
Detroit Tigers players
St. Louis Cardinals players
Boston Braves players
Sportspeople from Elgin, Illinois
Mt. Clemens Bathers players
Syracuse Stars (minor league baseball) players
Omaha Rourkes players
Milwaukee Brewers (minor league) players
Little Rock Travelers players
Dallas Steers players
Fort Worth Panthers players
New Haven Profs players
Sportspeople from the Chicago metropolitan area